George M. Farley was an American football player and collegiate football and basketball coach. He served as the head football coach (1935–1936, 1941–1942) and head men's basketball coach (1933–1937, 1940–1943) at Nebraska Wesleyan University in Lincoln, Nebraska.

Farley played college football at the University of Nebraska–Lincoln, lettering from 1927 to 1929 as a halfback.

Head coaching record

College football

References

Year of birth missing
Year of death missing
American football halfbacks
Basketball coaches from Iowa
Nebraska Wesleyan Prairie Wolves athletic directors
Nebraska Cornhuskers football players
Nebraska Wesleyan Prairie Wolves football coaches
Nebraska Wesleyan Prairie Wolves men's basketball coaches
High school football coaches in Kansas
People from Sioux City, Iowa
Players of American football from Iowa